The long-tongued fruit bat (Macroglossus sobrinus) is a species of megabat. It is nectarivorous, feeding on nectar from primarily banana flowers. It is found in several countries in South and Southeast Asia.

Taxonomy and etymology
It was described as a new subspecies in 1911 by Danish mammalogist Knud Andersen. Andersen described it as a subspecies of the long-tongued nectar bat, with the trinomen Macroglossus minimus sobrinus.
Beginning in approximately 1983, it has been considered a full species rather than a subspecies. Its species name "sobrinus" means "cousin;" Andersen possibly chose this name to reflect what he believed was its close relationship to M. minimus minimus.

Description
Andersen noted that it differed from the long-tongued nectar bat in several ways. Overall, it is a larger species with a longer snout.

Biology and ecology
The long-tongued fruit bat feeds on nectar almost exclusively from banana flowers. It is nocturnal, foraging at night and roosting during the day in trees. It roosts singly or in small, "well-spaced parties."

Range and habitat
Unlike the long-tongued nectar bat, which is considered a coastal species, the long-tongued fruit bat is considered an inland species. Its range includes several countries in Asia, including Cambodia, China, India, Indonesia, Laos, Malaysia, Myanmar, Thailand, and Vietnam.

Conservation
It is currently assessed as least concern by the IUCN—its lowest conservation priority.

References

Macroglossus
Mammals described in 1911
Bats of Southeast Asia
Bats of Indonesia
Bats of Malaysia
Mammals of India
Least concern biota of Oceania
Taxa named by Knud Andersen